Alireza Afzalipour (26 March 1909 – 7 April 1993) was an Iranian engineer, businessman and philanthropist who is known as the founder of Shahid Bahonar University of Kerman because of his financial support and outstanding donation to Shahid Bahonar University of Kerman as well as Kerman Medical University.
He died aged 84 in 1993.

Education
He was born in Tafresh and attended schools in Tehran. Having been granted a scholarship by the Iranian government, he then went to France to study. In 1937, he graduated with a BSc in general chemistry and an MSc in agricultural chemistry. He returned to Iran after finishing his studies in France.

Career
He established his business in electronic products which made him a wealthy man.

University
He planned to build a university and started his research by closely visiting 11 universities in Europe and almost all of universities in Iran. He finally chose Kerman for the location of the university he intended to build. After preliminary studies, about 50 hectares was allocated to the construction on 25 December 1974, and the work began with his 600,000,000-rial donation at the time. The university was officially opened on 15 September 1985. Shahid Bahonar University of Kerman founded by him, is now one of the biggest universities in Iran and the region. The Medical School of the Kerman University of Medical Sciences and a 350-bed hospital in Kerman now bear his name.

Personal life
His wife was Fakhereh Saba, an opera singer and university lecturer, who died on 14 July 2007 at age 82.

References 
 University of Kerman, about Afzallipour

External links
Official site of Kerman University of Medical Sciences
Shahid Bahonar University of Kerman

20th-century Iranian engineers
Iranian philanthropists
1909 births
1993 deaths
People from Tafresh
20th-century philanthropists
20th-century Iranian businesspeople
Shahid Bahonar University of Kerman